The Indian locomotive class YDM-1 is a class of diesel-Hydraulic  locomotive that was developed in 1954 by North British Locomotive Company (NBL) for Indian Railways. The model name stands for Metre gauge (Y), Diesel (D), Mixed traffic (M) engine, 1st generation (1). They entered service in 1955. A total of 20 YDM-1 locomotives was built between 1954 and 1956, which made them among the first MG main-line diesels.

The YDM-1 served both passenger and freight trains for over 46 years. As of January 2020, all 20 locomotives have been withdrawn from service with 3 locomotives being preserved at various location around India.

History 
These locomotives originally called 'DY' class was imported from North British Locomotive Company (NBL) to haul goods and passenger rakes in Western Railways particularly around Gandhidham due to of scarcity of water for steam locomotives. These are among the first Metre Gauge main-line diesels locomotives of India.

The YDM-1 class locomotives are the survivors from the second batch of North British diesel locos supplied in 1955.They were homed at a specifically made Diesel shed in Gandhidham. CLW replaced the engines on these with Maybach engines around 1975. Western Railways phased these locos out in the end of the 1990s [12/99] from mainline service and As shunter in Ajmer on 15.02.2001. The loco ( numbered 6002) came at NRM from Wankaner in August 2003 after renovation at Ajmer Loco Workshop.

Specification

Preserved Examples
A total of three YDM-1 locomotives have been preserved all over India.

Former shed 

 Gandhidham (GIM): All the locomotives of this class has been withdrawn from service.

See also

Rail transport in India#History
Indian Railways
Locomotives of India
Rail transport in India

References

External links

http://www.irfca.org/faq/faq-specs.html#YDM-1

India railway fan club

Diesel-hydraulic locomotives of India
B-B locomotives
NBL locomotives
Railway locomotives introduced in 1955
Metre gauge locomotives